Victor Issay Guidalevitch (Russian: 'Виктор Иссаы Гидалевич') (2 September 1892 – 19 January 1962), was a Belgian engineer of Russian origin who became an amateur photographer.

Guidalevitch photographed his surroundings, street scenes, landscapes, works of art, circus acts and sportsmen. He used various processes such as bromoil and bromide and tended to favour small formats. The style of his photographs is marked by modernism and pictorialism. Some of his images have qualities usually attributed to Dutch still lives.

Early life
Victor Guidalevitch was born in Simferopol, Crimea, Russian Empire on 2 September 1892.

Migration to Belgium
Guidalevitch emigrated to Belgium in 1911 and attended the Science department of the University of Liège. He graduated as an electrical engineer in 1920.

In 1928 he obtained Belgian citizenship.

World War 2
In 1940 Guidalevitch had to report himself in the registry of Jews in Antwerp and Wilrijk.

Photography
In 1925 Guidalevitch joined the "Iris" photo club in Antwerp.

From 1932 his works started appearing in exhibitions and publications. However, it wasn't until 1950 that he was recognized as an important photographer.

Victor Guidalevitch developed most of his photographs himself and had no commercial ambition, so there are very few prints available and they have become quite collectible.

Exhibitions
 2009: First Doubt: Optical Confusion in Modern Photography, Selections from the Collection of Allan Chasanoff, Yale University Art Gallery (USA). Artwork exhibited: Stagnation.
 2015: The Road, Robert Koch Gallery, San Francisco (USA). Artwork exhibited: Street Scene.
 2017: Les mystères de la chambre noire: Photographic Surrealism, 1920–1950, UBU Gallery, New York (USA). Artwork exhibited: Roi soldat.
 2019: Street Life, Robert Koch Gallery, San Francisco (USA). Artwork exhibited: Street Scene.

Collections
Victor Guidalevitch's work is held in the following public collections:

 Art Institute of Chicago: Relief
 Houston Museum of Fine Arts: I Think, Therefore I am, Lighter and Stagnation
 Smithsonian American Art Museum: Unidentified Boxer 1 and Unidentified Boxer 2
 Worcester Art Museum (WAM): Man descending stairs

References

External links 
 artnet: Victor Guidalevitch (59 artworks)
 Artsy: Victor Guidalevitch (7 artworks)
 Guidalevitch.art (biography, official documents and over 90 artworks, in French and English)
 Michael Lisi Contemporary Art: Guidalevitch, Victor (bio,  self-portrait and 1 artwork)
 Luminous-Lint: Victor Guidalevitch (5 artworks)
 Mutual Art: Victor Guidalevitch (short bio and 24 artworks)

1892 births
1962 deaths
20th-century photographers
Belgian Jews
Emigrants from the Russian Empire to Belgium
Engineers from Antwerp
Fine art photographers
Jewish artists
Jewish engineers
People from Simferopol
People from Wilrijk
Photographers from Antwerp
Russian photographers
University of Liège alumni